Ibrahim Sulemana (born 3 March 1987 in Accra) is a Ghanaian football striker.

Career
Sulemana began his youth career with Top Ten Academy Football club and then to Heart of Lions. He left on 4 January 2010 the Ghana Premier League club Heart of Lions and signed for 2/5 year with Turkish Bank Asya 1. Lig side Orduspor. Sulemana made his debut for Orduspor on 17 January 2010 against MKE Ankaragücü in the Turkish Cup.

References

1991 births
Living people
Ghanaian footballers
Ghana international footballers
Expatriate footballers in Turkey
Association football forwards
Footballers from Accra
Ghanaian expatriate footballers
Orduspor footballers
Ghanaian expatriate sportspeople in Turkey
Heart of Lions F.C. players